Lapai is a Local Government Area in Niger State, Nigeria, adjoining the Federal Capital Territory.

It has an area of 3,051 km and a population of 110,127 at the 2006 census. 
The area is roughly coterminous with the Lapai Emirate.

The postal code of the area is 911.

References

Local Government Areas in Niger State